William G. Betts ([?] 1865 – September 9, 1936) was an American Major League Baseball umpire. He was born William G. Betz.

A machinist, Betts designed a new umpire indicator for National League umpires prior to the  season. In 1896, he became the first umpire to use a small wisk broom to clean home plate during games. In between his stints in the National and American leagues, Betts worked Virginia League and the Atlantic League.

References

Books

External links

1865 births
1936 deaths
Major League Baseball umpires
Sportspeople from Washington, D.C.
19th-century baseball umpires